Very Severe Cyclonic Storm Thane was the strongest tropical cyclone of 2011 within the Bay of Bengal. Thane initially developed as a tropical disturbance within the monsoon trough to the west of Indonesia. Over the next couple of days the disturbance gradually developed further while moving towards the northwest, and was declared a Depression during December 25, before being named Cyclonic Storm Thane the next day. Thane started to turn towards the west under the influence of a subtropical ridge of high pressure before its development slowed during December 27, as a strong outflow and marginally favourable sea surface temperatures fought with persistent vertical wind shear. After its development had slowed during December 27, Thane became a Very Severe Cyclonic Storm during December 28, before as it approached the Indian states of Tamil Nadu, it weakened slightly. Thane then made landfall early on December 30, on the north Tamil Nadu coast between Cuddalore and Puducherry and rapidly weakened into a depression.

Meteorological history

On December 23, the Joint Typhoon Warning Center (JTWC) reported that a tropical disturbance had developed within the monsoon trough about 1540 km (960 mi) to the east of Medan in Indonesia. Convection surrounding the system had started to consolidate over a weak low level circulation centre, that was being fed by an enhanced westerly flow associated with the precursor system to Tropical Cyclone Benilde. Over the next couple of days the disturbance gradually developed further while moving towards the northwest, with a Madden–Julian oscillation increasing the system boundary layers rotation. The JTWC then issued a Tropical Cyclone Formation Alert on the system during December 25 before designating as Tropical Cyclone 06B later that day as 1-minute wind speeds near the centre reached  which is equivalent to a tropical storm.

Early on December 26, the IMD reported that the depression had intensified into a Deep Depression, before later that day reporting that it had intensified into a cyclonic storm and named it Thane. As it was named, Thane started to turn towards the west under the influence of a subtropical ridge of high pressure before its development slowed as strong outflow and marginally favourable sea surface temperatures fought with persistent easterly vertical wind shear. During the rest of that day, the system continued to move westwards and weakened slightly as it started to interact with land. Thane then made landfall as a borderline very severe cyclonic storm during December 30 on the north Tamil Nadu coast between Cuddalore and Puducherry. After it had made landfall, frictional forces made Thane rapidly weaken into a depression. As a result, the JTWC issued their final advisory during December 30, while the IMD continued to monitor the remnants of Thane until the depression weakened into a well-marked low-pressure area early on December 31.

Preparations and Impact

Tamil Nadu and Puducherry

Forty eight people were killed by Cyclone Thane. About 9 deaths were reported in Puducherry and 39 people were reported dead in Cuddalore. Cuddalore and Puducherry were the worst affected by Thane. The storm made Cuddalore inaccessible by damaging road network and the National Disaster Response Force and fire and rescue services had difficulty in reaching the cyclone affected fishing hamlets.

Fishing activities had come to a complete halt in the cities of Chennai, Tiruvallur and Kanchipuram in the wake of the storm after the warnings by the weather department were received. About 10,000 fishing boats were moved to safer locations in all fishing hamlets in these areas. Chennai Corporation kept its four permanent relief centers (Basin Bridge, Chintadripet, Gopalapuram and Perambur Barracks Road) ready to accommodate people in case of evacuation due to torrential rains. People from low-lying areas were shifted to community centers with adequate arrangements of food and medical round the clock.

Tamil Nadu Chief Minister Jayalalithaa ordered the immediate release of  150 crore towards relief and restoration of infrastructure damaged by the Cyclone Thane. She also directed the District Collectors, Deputy Collectors and department Secretaries to assess the extent of the damage caused by Cyclone Thane.

Andhra Pradesh
700 fishermen were reported to be stranded near the Nizampatnam Bay area due to the rough sea conditions near the coast due to the cyclone. Owners had asked the government as well as the National Coast Guard for the fishermen's search and rescue after they could not communicate with them.

The former chief minister of Andhra Pradesh, Nallari Kiran Kumar Reddy  instructed all the district collectors of the concerned districts of the state, mainly Nellore and Prakasam districts to take all precautionary measures in anticipation of the approaching storm. APSRTC was asked to keep sufficient buses in reserve in case of evacuation of the people. Officials reported that food stocks, drinking water, emergency power etc. were kept ready in reserves.

See also
Cyclone Vardah
Cyclone Jal
Cyclone Laila

References

External links

India Meteorological Department
Joint Typhoon Warning Center 
Corporate Disaster Resource Network, India
Rapid Response, India

2011 North Indian Ocean cyclone season
Very severe cyclonic storms
Tropical cyclones in India
2010s in Tamil Nadu
Disasters in Tamil Nadu
Tropical cyclones in 2011